Thomas Kennedy (1673 – 19 May 1754) was a Scottish lawyer from Dunure, Ayrshire, and a Tory politician. He sat in the House of Commons of Great Britain from 1720 to 1721, and then became a judge of the Scottish Court of Exchequer.

Early life and family 
He was the oldest son of Sir Thomas Kennedy of Kirkhill and Dunure (Lord Provost of Edinburgh from 1685 to 1687) and Agnes Halden. He was educated at the University of Edinburgh and at Utrecht University, and was admitted as an advocate in 1698.

In 1714 he married Grizel Kynynmont, daughter of Patrick Kynynmont of Kynynmont, Fife, and widow of Sir Alexander Murray, 1st Baronet, of Melgund, Forfar. They had no children.

Career 
Kennedy was joint Solicitor General for Scotland from 1709 to 1714, sharing the office with Sir James Stewart, 1st Baronet. He was appointed as Lord Advocate in March 1714, but he was dismissed in October 1714 after George I succeeded to the throne.  He later supported the 2nd Duke of Argyll, who organised his return at a by-election in January 1720 as Member of Parliament (MP) for Ayr Burghs.

He ended his parliamentary career a year later, when he was appointed as a judge of the Scottish Court of Exchequer.

References 
 

1673 births
1754 deaths
People from South Ayrshire
Alumni of the University of Edinburgh
Utrecht University alumni
Solicitors General for Scotland
Lord Advocates
Members of the Parliament of Great Britain for Scottish constituencies
British MPs 1715–1722
Barons of the Court of Exchequer (Scotland)
Members of the Faculty of Advocates